Wayne Maurice Clark (born May 30, 1947) is a former American football quarterback in the National Football League (NFL). He was drafted by the San Diego Chargers in the eighth round of the 1970 NFL Draft. He played college football at U.S. International University and the University of Miami. After his career, Clark was discovered to have chronic traumatic encephalopathy.

Clark also played for the Cincinnati Bengals and Kansas City Chiefs.

References

1947 births
Living people
American football quarterbacks
United States International Gulls football players
Miami Hurricanes football players
San Diego Chargers players
Cincinnati Bengals players
Kansas City Chiefs players
Players of American football from Iowa
People from Oskaloosa, Iowa